LFO is the debut album by American pop group LFO. It was released on August 24, 1999, under Arista Records.

Track listing

Notes
"Can't Have You" contains elements of "The Glow of Love", written by Wayne Garfield, Mauro Malavasi and David Romani.
"Baby Be Mine" contains replayed elements of "Human", written by Jimmy Jam & Terry Lewis.
"My Block" contains replayed elements of "She's a Bad Mama Jama", written by Leon Haywood. Contains re-sung elements of "Ladies' Night", written by George Brown, Robert Bell, Ronald Bell, Claydes Smith, James Taylor, Earl Toon, Dennis Thomas and Meekaaeel Muhammad.
  signifies remix and additional production
  signifies a co-producer

Charts

Weekly charts

Year-end charts

Certifications and sales

References

1999 debut albums
LFO (American band) albums
Arista Records albums
Albums produced by Cutfather